Map of places in Dundee compiled from this list
See the list of places in Scotland for places in other counties.

This List of places in Dundee is a list of links for any town, village, hamlet, airport, museum ship, railway, school, theatre, university   in the Dundee City council area of Scotland.

A
Ardler

B
Balgay, Balgay Hill
Balgillo
Balgowan
Ballumbie
Barnhill
Blackness
Broughty Ferry, Broughty Ferry railway station

C
Caird Hall
Camperdown, Camperdown Country Park
Charleston
City Centre
Claverhouse
Craigiebank

D
Dens Park
Douglas
Downfield
Duncan of Jordanstone School of Art and Design
Dundee Airport
Dundee and Arbroath Railway
Dundee Contemporary Arts
Dundee Parish Church (St Mary's)
Dundee railway station
Dundee Repertory Theatre

F
Fairmuir
Fintry
Firth of Tay

G
Gowrie Park
Grove Academy

H
Harris Academy
Hilltown

K
Kirkton

L
Law
Lawside
Lochee
Logie
Linlathen

M
McManus Galleries
Menzieshill
Mid Craigie
Mill o' Mains
Mills Observatory

N
Ninewells

P
Pitkerro

R
River Tay
RRS Discovery

S
St Marys
St Paul's Cathedral
Scottish Dance Theatre, Scottish School of Contemporary Dance 
Steeple Church
Stobswell

T
Tannadice Park
Tay Rail Bridge
Tay Road Bridge

U
University of Abertay Dundee
University of Dundee

W
West End
 Western Cemetery, Perth Road
Whitfield
Woodside

See also
List of places in Scotland

Dundee
Geography of Dundee
Lists of places in Scotland
Populated places in Scotland

Places